Naval Headquarters (NHQ) is the name of the headquarters of many of the world's navies. These include:

Naval Headquarters (Pakistan Navy)
Naval Headquarters (Sri Lanka Navy)
Royal Australian Navy#Command structure
Nigerian Navy#Naval Headquarters
Navy Command Headquarters (Royal Navy), NCHQ